Dario Salata (21 April 1913 – 7 December 1990) was an Italian sailor. He competed at the 1948 Summer Olympics and the 1952 Summer Olympics.

References

External links
 

1913 births
1990 deaths
Italian male sailors (sport)
Olympic sailors of Italy
Sailors at the 1948 Summer Olympics – Swallow
Sailors at the 1952 Summer Olympics – 5.5 Metre